Grandees of Spain are the highest-ranking members of the Spanish nobility. They comprise nobles who hold the most important historical landed titles in Spain or its former colonies. Many such hereditary titles are held by heads of families, having been acquired via strategic marriages between landed families.

All Grandees, of which there were originally three ranks, are now deemed to be of equal status (i.e. "of the first class"); this designation is nowadays titular, conveying neither power nor legal privileges.

A grandeza (Grandeeship) can be held regardless of possession of a title of nobility, however each grandeza was normally (although not always) granted in conjunction with a noble title. With the exception of Fernandina, grandezas have been granted with all Spanish ducal titles.

Grandees, their consorts and first-born heirs are entitled to the honorific prefix of "The Most Excellent" ( (male), abbreviated Excmo. Sra.). In written form, their names are followed by the post-nominals GE.

The following is an incomplete list of extant Spanish noble titles that are held in conjunction with a Grandeeship:

Dukedoms

Marquessates

Countships

Viscountcies

Baronies

Lordships

Individual

There are 7 non-title attached Grandeeships that are individual. These are still hereditary and transmissible just like regular titles.

Royal Grandees

There are also 25 non-title attached Grandeeships that correspond to the offspring of Infantes of Spain. These are not hereditary or transmissible.

See also 

 Grandee
 Spanish nobility
 Hidalgo (Spanish nobility)
 Boletín Oficial del Estado

References

Bibliography

External links 
 Diputación de la Grandeza de España 

 
Lists of Spanish nobility